Lesbia was the literary pseudonym used by the Roman poet Gaius Valerius Catullus ( 82–52 BC) to refer to his lover. Lesbia is traditionally identified with Clodia, the wife of Quintus Caecilius Metellus Celer and sister of Publius Clodius Pulcher; her conduct and motives are maligned in Cicero's extant speech Pro Caelio, delivered in 56 BC.

Overview
Lesbia is the subject of 25 of Catullus' 116 surviving poems, and these display a wide range of emotions (see Catullus 85), ranging from tender love (e. g. Catullus 5, Catullus 7), to sadness and disappointment (e.g. Catullus 72), and to bitter sarcasm (e.g. Catullus 8), following the often unsteady course of Catullus' relationship.

The name evokes the poet Sappho, who was from the isle of Lesbos. Catullus's poem 35 celebrating his poet friend Caecilius of Novum Comum also mentions the devotion of Caecilius' girlfriend, who is herself accorded a remarkable tribute as "girl more learned than Sappho's Muse" (lines 16–17: Sapphica puella /  musa doctior). This could well be Catullus' Lesbia before she became his own lover.

It may be significant that a poem which looks like an envoi to Lesbia (Catullus 11) is written in the Sapphic metre; the only other poem in the collection composed in this metre is poem 51, which looks like it could be the first poem written to her. What makes this more likely is that the poem is an elegant translation of a poem by Sappho herself, which is still extant.

She may have been a poet in her own right, included with Catullus in a list of famous poets whose lovers "often" helped them write their verses.
The name Lesbia was chosen for several reasons, including its metrical match with her real name. The 2nd century AD orator Apuleius of Madaura gave a list of four such identities in court, to defend himself against the charge of hiding names under an alias:

Catullus's Lesbia: Clodia
Ticida's Perilla:  Metella
Propertius' Cynthia: Hostia
Tibullus' Delia: Plania

Apuleius' information is thought to have come from Suetonius' de poetis, or Suetonius' most important source, a work on late Republican and Augustan period poets by Gaius Julius Hyginus.

Thomas draws parallels between Lesbia and one of the Meleager's lovers, Phanion.

Gallery

References

Citations

Ancient sources

The Catullan libellus of 116 poems
Oxford Classical Texts, C. Valerii Catulli Carmina (ed.) R A B Mynors (Oxford University Press, 1958)
Penguin Classics, English translation, The Poems of Catullus by Peter Whigham (Penguin Books, 1966)

Modern works

Wiseman, T Peter:Catullan Questions (Leicester University Press, 1969), especially chapter 5: "Lesbia - When?" (42–49), and chapter 6: "Lesbia - Who?" (50–60)
Wiseman, T. Peter. Cinna the Poet and other Roman Essays (Leicester University Press, 1974), especially chapter 5: "Lesbia and her Children" (104–118)
Oxford Latin Reader, Maurice Balme and James Morewood (1997)
Hallett,  Judith P: "Catullus and Horace on Roman Women Poets", Antichthon 40 (Thematic issue: Catullus in Contemporary Perspective, 2006), 65–88

Latin poetry
1st-century BC Roman women
1st-century BC Romans
Clodii